An annular solar eclipse will occur on July 2, 2038. A solar eclipse occurs when the Moon passes between Earth and the Sun, thereby totally or partly obscuring the image of the Sun for a viewer on Earth. An annular solar eclipse occurs when the Moon's apparent diameter is smaller than the Sun's, blocking most of the Sun's light and causing the Sun to look like an annulus (ring). An annular eclipse appears as a partial eclipse over a region of the Earth thousands of kilometres wide.

Images 
Animated path

Related eclipses 

There are a 7 eclipses in 2038 (the maximum possible), included four penumbral lunar eclipses: January 21, June 17, July 16, and December 11.

Solar eclipses of 2036–2039

Saros 137 

It is a part of Saros cycle 137, repeating every 18 years, 11 days, containing 70 events. The series started with partial solar eclipse on May 25, 1389. It contains total eclipses from August 20, 1533 through December 6, 1695, first set of hybrid eclipses from December 17, 1713 through February 11, 1804, first set of annular eclipses from February 21, 1822 through March 25, 1876, second set of hybrid eclipses from April 6, 1894 through April 28, 1930, and second set of annular eclipses from May 9, 1948 through April 13, 2507. The series ends at member 70 as a partial eclipse on June 28, 2633. The longest duration of totality was 2 minutes, 55 seconds on September 10, 1569. Solar Saros 137 has 55 umbral eclipses from August 20, 1533 through April 13, 2507 (973.62 years). That's almost 1 millennium!

Metonic series

References

External links 
 http://eclipse.gsfc.nasa.gov/SEplot/SEplot2001/SE2038Jul02A.GIF

2038 7 2
2038 in science
2038 7 2
2038 7 2